The Westfries Museum is a museum of regional history established in the Dutch city of Hoorn.

It was opened on 10 January 1880 and has been established in a monumental building dating to 1632.  This building originally belonged to the Gecommitteerde Raden van West-Friesland en het Noorderkwartier, as a part of the Staten van Holland en West-Friesland, and later became a court.  Until 1932 part of the building housed the kanton's court and part of its museum.

The museum has an extensive collection of paintings, silver objects, porcelain, historic firearms, objects of the schutterij and VOC objects.  The collection is exhibited in 25 rooms, of which one is a style-room.  In 1953, 15th century cellars were discovered under the building.  These have been restored and are now used as exhibition spaces for archaeological objects from Hoorn and its surroundings.

The museum is supported by the Friends Foundation of the Westfries Museum that was set up on the initiative of the Westfries Society.

On 10 January 2005, the night the museum celebrated its 125th anniversary, four people stole 21 paintings of its paintings, including a piece by Jan van Goyen from his youth, and part of the silver collection, valued in the millions of Euros. Four of the paintings were found back in Ukraine in April 2016.

Stolen from the Westfries Museum

External links

Museums in North Holland
Hoorn
History museums in the Netherlands
Local museums in the Netherlands
Decorative arts museums
1880 establishments in the Netherlands
19th-century architecture in the Netherlands